Music for Violin and Piano is an album by violinist Mark Feldman and pianist Sylvie Courvoisier which was released on the Avant label in 1999.

Reception

In his review for Allmusic, Mark W.B. Allender notes that " Both Feldman and Courvoisier  each other well as they play in perfect step with one another. Highly recommended". All About Jazz said "Feldman's playing, crystalline but fluid, evokes an intimate chamber music aesthetic. Courvoisier covers the range from lush chordal progressions to punchy clusters to light prepared-piano tinkles, constantly evolving a florid sense of drama. While the balance of improvisation and composition on this record tilts more toward the latter than usual, it's quite a refreshing change".

Track listing
All compositions by Sylvie Courvoisier & Mark Feldman
 "Smoke" - 2:57  
 "One Too: Too Romantisch Too / Too Speedy" - 9:15  
 "La Goulante de l'Idiot" - 9:15  
 "Kit: Les Tenebrides / Murmur / Luna Park" - 13:46  
 "Gugging" - 7:35  
 "Dog Town Road" - 3:32  
 "Valse Nise" - 7:30  
 "Terre d'Agala" - 7:34

Personnel
Mark Feldman - violin
Sylvie Courvoisier - piano

References 

Avant Records albums
Mark Feldman albums
Sylvie Courvoisier albums
1999 albums